Abdullayeva is a feminine surname, found in Azerbaijan, Russian, and Central Asia. It is slavicized from Abdullah. The masculine surname counterpart is Abdullayev.

 Aida Abdullayeva (1922–2009), Azerbaijani Soviet harpist
 Dzhanet Abdullayeva, suicide bomber, one of the perpetrators of the 2010 Moscow Metro bombings
 Hayat Abdullayeva (1912–2006), Azerbaijani sculptor
 Layes Abdullayeva (born 1991), Ethiopia-born Azerbaijani track and field athlete
 Leyla Abdullayeva (born 1981), Azerbaijani diplomat
 Nafisa Abdullaeva (born 1978), Uzbekistani lawyer and business coach
 Sabina Abdullayeva (born 1996), Azerbaijani paralympic judoka
 Tamilla Abdullayeva (born 1943) Azerbaijani actress
 Zohra Abdullayeva (1952–2021), Azerbaijani singer

See also 

 Abdullah (name)

Russian-language surnames
Uzbek-language surnames
Azerbaijani-language surnames
Slavic-language female forms of surnames